The following events occurred in June 1943:

June 1, 1943 (Tuesday)
The American liberty ship SS John Morgan was setting out from Baltimore on its maiden voyage with a cargo of explosives, and accidentally rammed the tanker SS Montana, which was entering the harbor.  Sixty-five of the 68 men on the Morgan were killed in the blast, while 18 of the 82 men on the Montana were burned to death in the subsequent blaze.  The U.S. Navy waited five days before releasing the news.

British Overseas Airways Corporation Flight 777, a DC-3 airplane on a scheduled passenger flight, was shot down over the Bay of Biscay during an encounter with eight German Junkers Ju 88s.  All 17 persons aboard perished, including the film actor Leslie Howard, who had starred as Ashley Wilkes in Gone with the Wind. There was speculation that the downing was an attempt to kill British Prime Minister Winston Churchill and that the Germans may have mistakenly believed that he was aboard.  
When the truce called by the UMWA in the coal mine strike expired at 12:01 am, union miners walked off of their jobs for the second time in five weeks.  John L. Lewis ordered the men to return to work at the end of the week. 
Born: Kuki Gallmann, Italian author who wrote of her experiences in Kenya, including her book I Dreamed of Africa; in Treviso

June 2, 1943 (Wednesday)
Liquidation of the Lwów Ghetto, located in German-occupied Poland, was completed, with the last surviving Jewish residents deported to the nearby Janowska concentration camp.  At one time, there had been 160,000 Jews in Lwów  which the Germans had renamed Lemberg.  Nearly all of the former dwellers would be killed by November.  After the Soviet victory in World War II, the city would become part of the Ukrainian SSR and renamed Lvov.
The German submarines U-105, U-202, U-462 and U-521 were all lost to enemy action in the Atlantic Ocean.
The comedy film Hit the Ice starring Abbott and Costello was released.
Born: 
Ilaiyaraaja, Indian classical musician and film score composer; as Raja Gnanadhesikan in Pannaipuram, Theni District, Tamil Nadu state. 
Blinky Palermo (artistic name of Peter Schwarze), German abstract artist; in Leipzig (died 1977)
Died:
 Nile Kinnick, 24, winner of college football's Heisman Trophy in 1939 at the University of Iowa. Kinnick, who had passed up on an NFL career, disappeared when his F4F Wildcat fighter plane crashed during a training mission. He ditched in the ocean off of the coast of Venezuela when his plane began leaking oil while he was returning to the aircraft carrier USS Lexington.
John Frank Stevens, 90, American engineer, chief engineer on the Panama Canal 
Dr. Allan Roy Dafoe, 60, Canadian physician to the Dionne quintuplets

June 3, 1943 (Thursday)
The "Zoot Suit Riots" began when 11 U.S. servicemen, on shore leave in Los Angeles, got into a fight with a group of Mexican-American youths.  The next day, about 200 servicemen, mostly U.S. Navy sailors, rode in taxis to the Hispanic neighborhoods in East L.A. and began attacking non-white residents; by June 7, thousands of civilians were involved in the fighting.  The U.S. Navy and U.S. Army barred military personnel from venturing into downtown L.A., ending the riots.<ref>"Los Angeles Zoot Suit Riots", in LosAngelesAlmanac.com; "L.A. ZOOT SUIT DISORDERS SPREAD", Long Beach (CA) Independent", June 8, 1943, p1 Robert Sickels, American Popular Culture Through History: The 1940s (Greenwood Publishing Group, 2004) p93; Himilce Novas, Everything You Need to Know about Latino History: 2008 Edition (Penguin, 2007) p98</ref>
The French Committee of National Liberation (Comité Français de Libération Nationale, CFLN) was formed with headquarters in Algiers and Generals Charles de Gaulle and Henri Giraud as co-presidents.
The Battle of West Hubei in China ended in a tactical draw.
Inventor Robert Hurley filed a patent application for the pocket protector, designed for carrying ink pens in shirt pockets. Hurley would be awarded U.S. Patent No. 2,417,786 on March 18, 1947 for his "Pocket Shield or Protector".

June 4, 1943 (Friday)

A coup d'état in Argentina ousted President Ramón Castillo, who had insisted on strict neutrality during World War II and continued to maintain diplomatic relations with the Axis powers.  Castillo fled from Buenos Aires to a warship and resigned the next day, surrendering to military forces at La Plata.  General Arturo Rawson was named by military as the new President of Argentina on Saturday but, after three days, announced on Monday that he would decline to be sworn in to office and would yield the position to General Pedro Ramirez.
Henri Giraud was appointed Commander-in-Chief of Free French Forces. 
The German submarine U-308 was torpedoed and sunk in the Norwegian Sea by the British submarine Truculent, while U-594 was sunk west of Gibraltar by a rocket attack from a Lockheed Hudson of No. 48 Squadron RAF.
Born:  
John "Burgo" Burgess, Australian TV show host (including that nation's Wheel of Fortune show) 
Joyce Meyer, American evangelist; in St. Louis
Died: U.S. Army Major Kermit Roosevelt, 53, American explorer and author, and son of former U.S. President Theodore Roosevelt; by a self-inflicted gunshot wound while serving in Alaska at Fort Richardson.

June 5, 1943 (Saturday)
Pierre Laval, the puppet chief of government for Nazi occupied France, told his countrymen in a radio broadcast that an additional 200,000 Frenchmen needed to be sent to Germany to assist in war production.
A state funeral was held in Japan for Isoroku Yamamoto.
A squad of chemical warfare soldiers, making sure the wind was away from spectators, exploded small vials of mustard, chloro-picrine, lewisite and phosgene gases in a simulated air raid in New York City, to test the ability of civil defense workers to recognize the different chemical agents.
The German submarine U-217 was depth charged and sunk in the Atlantic Ocean by an American Grumman TBF Avenger from the escort carrier USS Bogue.
Josef Mengele was promoted to Chief Medical Examination Officer at Auschwitz in Poland.

June 6, 1943 (Sunday)
The new French Committee of National Liberation made a radio broadcast from Algiers pledging to abolish the "arbitrary powers" imposed by the Vichy government and to restore "all French liberties, the laws of the Republic and the Republican regime."
Count Fleet won the Belmont Stakes to complete the Triple Crown of Thoroughbred Racing.  The thoroughbred had won the Kentucky Derby on May 1, and the Preakness Stakes only one week later, on May 8.
Ohio University student Paul Newman, who had enlisted in the U.S. Navy four days before his 18th birthday, was called up for active duty.  The future Oscar-winning film actor, nicknamed "Gus" Newman, enrolled in the pilot training program but was soon kicked out because it was discovered that he was color blind.
Born: Richard Smalley, American chemist and physicist, winner of 1996 Nobel Prize in Chemistry for being a co-discoverer of buckminsterfullerene; in Akron, Ohio (died 2005)

June 7, 1943 (Monday)
General Arturo Rawson decided not to take office as President of Argentina after failing to get support from other officers, and yielded to General Pedro Ramirez.
Born:  
Chan Hung-lit, Chinese actor in the Hong Kong film and television industries; in Shanghai (died 2009) 
Nikki Giovanni, American poet, in Knoxville, Tennessee
Superstar Billy Graham, professional wrestler, in Phoenix, Arizona

June 8, 1943 (Tuesday)
Ammunition in the magazine on the Japanese battleship Mutsu, exploded during extremely hot weather, while the ship was anchored in the harbor at Hashirajima, killing 1,222 people  including 1,121 of the 1,474 member crew.
 The Battle of Porta between the Royal Italian Army and the Greek People's Liberation Army began.
Born: Colin Baker, British TV actor best known as the sixth Dr. Who; in London

June 9, 1943 (Wednesday)
The first automatic payroll tax in the United States was implemented by the passage of the Current Tax Payment Act of 1943, which was signed into law the next day.  Under the new procedure, employers deducted the taxes from the employees' checks, then paid the equivalent amount to the federal government at the end of the month, replacing the system of employees paying taxes on their salaries at the end of each tax year.
James F. Byrnes, the director of the U.S. Office of War Mobilization, told a press conference that he had no intention to be the Democratic nominee for Vice-President in 1944 if President Franklin Roosevelt pursued a fourth term.
 The Battle of Porta between the Royal Italian Army and the Greek People's Liberation Army ended in Thessaly. Italian forces burned down the villages of Porta, Vatsinia, Chania (Trikala), and Ropotania.
Three days before his 19th birthday, future United States President George H. W. Bush became the youngest aviator in the U.S. Navy.

June 10, 1943 (Thursday)
The Pointblank directive was issued by the Combined Chiefs of Staff of the Allied powers, to implement Operation Pointblank, the code name for the constant Combined Bomber Offensive.  The highest priority target to be destroyed was Germany's aircraft industry, followed by producers of ball bearings, petroleum, grinding wheels and abrasives.  The U.S. Eighth Air Force bombed Germany during daylight and the UK's Royal Air Force Bomber Command conducted heavier bombing at night.
 
Germany and Italy gave diplomatic recognition to the new government of Argentina, the only nation in the Western Hemisphere that still maintained relations with the Axis powers.  That night, however, the new regime of General Pedro Ramírez decreed that the German, Italian and Japanese would no longer have permission to transmit up to 100 words in code to their capitals, a privilege that had been extended back in December.  The U.S. and the U.K. gave recognition to the Ramírez government the next day.
The Berlin Gemeinde, the last Jewish hospital in the German capital, was closed, and its 200 employees and 300 patients were sent to Theresienstadt on June 16.

June 11, 1943 (Friday)
The Italian island of Pantelleria was surrendered to the Allies unconditionally at 11:40 am local time, after 19 days of aerial bombardment, providing a base from which the invasion of Sicily could be staged.  "This marked the first time in history a complete surrender resulted solely from air attack without ground action", one historian would note later.
Britain's Royal Air Force bombed Düsseldorf and Münster in its heaviest attack up to that time, while the U.S. 8th Air Force made a daylight raid on Wilhelmshaven and Cuxhaven.  The U.S. raid involved 225 airplanes, and an unprecedented 85 of them were shot down or crashed. The 462 tons of bombs dropped was a new high for U.S. bombing.  
American coal miners went out on strike for the second time in two months, as UMWA President John L. Lewis called for the walkout against the federal government, which was overseeing the mines.  President Roosevelt temporarily halted the strike by suggesting that he would ask Congress to pass a law to have striking miners drafted.  Another strike would be called in October.
The German submarine U-417 was sunk in the North Atlantic by a B-17 of No. 206 Squadron RAF.
The Japanese submarine I-24 was sunk off Shemya, Alaska by the U.S. Navy subchaser Larchmont.
The Australian corvette HMAS Wallaroo sank off Fremantle after a collision with the American Liberty ship Henry Gilbert Costin.
The Technicolor musical film Coney Island starring Betty Grable, George Montgomery and Cesar Romero was released.

June 12, 1943 (Saturday)
Düsseldorf suffered its heaviest air raid of the war when 693 bombers dropped 2,000 tons of bombs in the space of 45 minutes.
The American submarine USS R-12 was on practice maneuvers when it sank without warning, plunging to the bottom of the sea near Key West, Florida, with the loss of 42 of the 47 people on board.  The R-12 would not be relocated until almost 68 years later, on May 25, 2011.
The German submarine U-118 was depth charged and sunk in the Atlantic by an American Grumman TBM Avenger.
"Taking a Chance on Love" by Benny Goodman and His Orchestra hit #1 on the Billboard singles chart.
Born: Friedrich Kittler, German literary scholar; in Rochlitz (died 2011)

June 13, 1943 (Sunday)
Subhas Chandra Bose, the Indian nationalist who had recently been in Nazi Germany seeking aid for independence from the United Kingdom, arrived in Japan on an Axis submarine.
The Zoot Suit Riots ended in Los Angeles after ten days.  Although there was property damage, nobody was killed or severely injured.
The Japanese submarine I-9 was sunk off Kiska by the destroyer USS Frazier.
Born: Malcolm McDowell, British actor; in Horsforth
Died: Brigadier General Nathan Bedford Forrest III of the U.S. Army Air Forces, 38, when the bomber he was riding in as an observer was shot down over Kiel during a raid.  Forrest was the great-grandson of Confederate Army General Nathan Bedford Forrest.

June 14, 1943 (Monday)
In the case of West Virginia State Board of Education v. Barnette, Flag Day in the United States, the U.S. Supreme Court ruled 6 to 3 that schoolchildren could not be required to pledge allegiance to or salute the American flag, if it violated their religious beliefs.  The suit had been brought by Walter Barnette and other members of the Jehovah's Witnesses, and led to the Court overruling its 1940 decision in Minersville School District v. Gobitis.
An American scientist, given the code name "Quantum" by the Soviet KGB, met with officials at the Soviet Embassy in Washington, DC, and turned over classified scientific information about separating the isotope Uranium-235 from uranium, part of the American atomic bomb project.  The American FBI and NSA intercepted news of the meeting from a cable sent on June 21 from the KGB's New York office, but were never able to learn the identity of "Quantum".  More than sixty years later, "Quantum" was discovered from declassified files from the former Soviet Union to have been Boris Podolsky. 
Earl Browder, the General Secretary of the Communist Party USA, began a correspondence with U.S. President Roosevelt, when Browder sent a cable to the President asking for White House intervention to protect leftist Victorio Codovilla from being deported from Argentina to Spain.  Roosevelt responded on June 23, pledging to ask the U.S. Ambassador at Buenos Aires to monitor the proceedings, and on June 26 sent Browder a second letter to advise that Cordovilla would not be deported.  The last reply was on July 12, when Browder thanked the President.
The German submarines U-334 and U-564 were lost to enemy action in the Atlantic Ocean.
Born: Jim Sensenbrenner, U.S. Representative for Wisconsin from 1979 to 2021; in Chicago

June 15, 1943 (Tuesday)
In Beaumont, Texas, a mob of about 4,000 white men, half of them employees of the Pennsylvania Shipyards, began burning and looting homes, businesses and automobiles in the city's African-American neighborhoods.  Texas State Guardsmen and Texas Rangers were called out by Acting Governor A. M. Aiken to assist Beaumont city police in keeping order, and martial law was declared in the city, lasting until June 20.
The prototype of the first turbojet powered bomber, Germany's Arado Ar 234 V1, made its first flight.
Born:  
Poul Nyrup Rasmussen, Prime Minister of Denmark from 1993 to 2001; in Esbjerg 
Johnny Hallyday (stage name for Jean-Philippe Smet), French rock singer; in Paris. (died 2017)

June 16, 1943 (Wednesday)
Subhas Chandra Bose met in Tokyo with Japanese Premier Hideki Tojo, and obtained a promise that Japan would help India gain its independence from the United Kingdom.
The German submarine U-97 was sunk west of Haifa by a Lockheed Hudson aircraft of No. 459 Squadron RAAF.
Charlie Chaplin married Oona O'Neill, the daughter of playwright Eugene O'Neill, who then disowned his daughter.  The Chaplins would raise eight children together and settle in Switzerland.
Born: Joan Van Ark, American TV actress known for Knots Landing; in New York City

June 17, 1943 (Thursday)
The British troopship SS Yoma was torpedoed and sunk northwest of Derna, Libya by German submarine U-81; 484 of the 1,961 aboard were killed.
Ayoub Tabet, the President of Lebanon, precipitated a crisis in the Middle Eastern nation that was populated by Muslims and Christians.  Tabet changed the makeup of the 63 seat Chamber of Deputies, which had 34 Christians and 29 Muslims.  The new arrangement was for a 54-seat body, with 32 seats for Christians and 22 for Muslims.  The decision set out rioting throughout Lebanon, and Tabet would be deposed a month later.
The Japanese submarine I-178 went missing somewhere off the east coast of Australia.  The wreckage would still be missing more than 75 years later.
Singer Perry Como signed a record contract with RCA and began a string of hit songs with the RCA label, recording well into the 1980s.
Joe Cronin of the Boston Red Sox became the first player in major league baseball history to swat pinch-hit home runs in both games of a doubleheader.
Born:  
Newt Gingrich, Speaker of the U.S. House of Representatives 1995–1999, and Congressman (R-Georgia) from 1979 to 1999; as Newton Leroy McPherson in Harrisburg, Pennsylvania 
Barry Manilow, American pop musician, in Brooklyn, New York City

June 18, 1943 (Friday)

The Tuskegee Airmen had their first encounter with the enemy, as six pilots of P-40 Warhawks were attacked over the island of Pantelleria by 12 German Focke-Wulf 190 fighters.  According to the U.S. Army Air Corps, "The American Negro fliers, led by First Lieut. Charles W. Dryden ... parried the Nazi thrust, damaged two German fighters, and forced the remainder to retire.  The Americans all came home safely."
Ahead of the upcoming Allied invasion of Sicily, Winston Churchill discreetly removed Field Marshal Sir Archibald Wavell and General Claude Auchinleck from their positions of command in battlefield zones by appointing them Viceroy of India and Commander-in-Chief, India, respectively.
Born: Willie Irvine, Northern Ireland footballer; in Eden, County Antrim

June 19, 1943 (Saturday)

Germany's Führer, Adolf Hitler, summoned SS Chief Heinrich Himmler to the Führer's mountain retreat at Obersalzberg.  According to a memorandum of the secret meeting, which Himmler entitled Banditenkampf und Sicherheitslage (The fight against bandits and the security situation), Hitler ordered that the Jewish resistance in Eastern Europe (by "bandits") should be eradicated over the next four months by the mass evacuation of Jews.
The Italian submarine Barbarigo was sunk in the Mediterranean Sea by U.S. aircraft.

June 20, 1943 (Sunday)
A fistfight at the crowded Belle Island park in Detroit, Michigan, erupted into a riot between white and black residents of the fourth largest city in the United States.  Over three days, 34 people were killed and 760 injured, before federal troops were sent in to restore the peace.
The New Georgia Campaign began.
The Battle of Lababia Ridge began between Australian and Japanese troops in the Territory of New Guinea.
The German submarine U-388 was depth charged and sunk off Cape Farewell, Greenland by a Consolidated PBY Catalina of the U.S. Navy.
The comic strip Penny, by Harry Haenigsen, first appeared in newspapers.  Haenigsen would discontinue the strip in 1970, after the death of his wife in an automobile accident.

June 21, 1943 (Monday)
Heinrich Himmler issued the order to transfer the remaining Jews from the Nazi-occupied Baltic states to small slave-labor camps in order to meet Germany's military needs.  The Reichskommissariat Ostland consisted of Latvia (Lettland), Lithuania (Litauen), Estonia (Estland), and Belarus (Weissruthenian).
The National Football League approved the temporary merger of the Philadelphia Eagles and the Pittsburgh Steelers into a single franchise, officially called "Phil-Pitt", and dubbed the "Steagles" by the press the next month.Matthew Algeo, Last Team Standing: How the Steelers and the Eagles—"The Steagles"—Saved Pro Football During World War II (Chicago Review Press, 2013) p52  At the same time, the NFL owners declined to let the Bears and Cardinals merge for the season.
In occupied Greece, as part of Operation Animals, British SOE agents destroy the railway bridge over the Asopos River, and guerrillas of the Greek People's Liberation Army ambush and destroy a German convoy at the Battle of Sarantaporos.

Jean Moulin, an official of the Armée secrète and a leader of the French Resistance against the Nazis, was captured in Caluire-et-Cuire by the Gestapo, along with nine of his associates.  Captain Klaus Barbie, who oversaw Gestapo operations in nearby Lyon, had been tipped off to Moulin's location.  Moulin was tortured for more than two weeks before dying on July 8.
In Stack v. Boyle, the U.S. Supreme Court ruled, 5–3, that the American citizenship of an alien could not be revoked simply because he had joined the Communist Party.  William Schneiderman, a Russian native, had become a citizen in 1927, and then had proceedings brought against him twelve years later for his activities as secretary for the California branch of the U.S. Communist Party.  Schneiderman's case was argued by Wendell Willkie, who had been the Republican candidate for President in 1940.   
The U.S. House of Representatives voted 345–0 to approve the appropriation of $71,510,438,873 for the U.S. Army, the biggest supply bill in history.
The Harvard Corporation rejected a recommendation, by the faculty of the Harvard Medical School, to admit women to the college's M.D. program.  The Corporation would allow the admission of women in 1944.

June 22, 1943 (Tuesday)
After the U.S. Army Air Forces lost 85 aircraft in the June 11 daylight raid on Wilhelmshaven and Cuxhaven, the second heaviest bombing by the U.S. of Germany took place, with only one-fifth of the losses.  The 8th Air Force dropped 422 tons of bombs, and lost 16 planes.

June 23, 1943 (Wednesday)
A general election was held in Ireland. The incumbent Fianna Fáil led by Éamon de Valera remained in power but was reduced to a minority government.
The Battle of Lababia Ridge ended in Allied victory.

Andrée Borrel, Francis Suttill, Gilbert Norman and several other agents in the Prosper network of British Special Operations Executive, were arrested by the Gestapo after being betrayed by an informer.  Borrel was one of seven women in the British spy network. On July 6, 1944, the group would be rendered unconscious with an injection of phenol, then burned alive.
Born: James Levine, music director for the Metropolitan Opera, and conductor 1971–2011; in Cincinnati (d. 2021)

June 24, 1943 (Thursday)
In order to investigate the medical effects of an emergency bailout at high altitude, Colonel W. Randolph Lovelace, a physician in the U.S. Army, jumped out of a B-17 bomber at an altitude of 40,200 feet.  Part of his self-experimentation was to show that bottled oxygen should be provided to bomber crews.  Colonel Lovelace was rendered temporarily unconscious from the 32 G shock from opening his chute during his faster descent in the thin atmosphere, and suffered severe frostbite when the deceleration ripped off his left glove, but landed safely after 24 minutes.  As a result of Lovelace's experience, flight crews learned to delay opening their chutes until they reached a lower altitude.  Lovelace would be awarded the Distinguished Flying Cross for his bravery.

Baldur von Schirach, the 36-year-old leader of the Hitler Youth, lost the influence he had had on the Nazi German government, after arguing with the Führer, Adolf Hitler, about the need to end the war with the Allies.  Schirach would continue to be the Reichsjugendführer, but Hitler would never talk to him again.
The German submarines U-119, U-194, U-200 and U-449 were all lost to enemy action.
The Frank Borzage-directed musical film Stage Door Canteen was released.

June 25, 1943 (Friday)
The eradication of Jews in the Soviet Ukrainian city of Stanislav (now Ivano-Frankivsk) was completed, with less than 100 surviving out of several thousand.
The Smith–Connally Act, allowing the federal government to seize and operate industries threatened by or under strikes that would interfere with war production, was passed over President Roosevelt's veto.
Born: Carly Simon, musician, in New York City

June 26, 1943 (Saturday)
More than 200 German Navy crewmen, from six different U-boats based in Nazi-occupied Norway, mutinied.  The men refused to obey orders to go out to sea, where Allied ships had been destroying the submarines at a greatly increased rate since May.  The mutineers were arrested and lodged in the Akershus Prison in Oslo.
The U.S. Congress voted overwhelmingly to override President Roosevelt's veto of the Conally-Smith-Harness anti-strike bill.  Roosevelt's veto message was read to the Senate, citing the likelihood that the bill was "more likely to foment labor troubles than to settle them".  Five minutes later, the Senate voted 56–25 to pass the bill, and the House followed later in the day with a 244–108 override.

Born:
Klaus von Klitzing, German physicist, recipient of the 1985 Nobel Prize in Physics for his discovery of the quantum Hall effect; in Środa Wielkopolska, in German-occupied Poland
Warren Farrell, American educator, gender equality activist and author; in Queens, New York City.
Died:  
Karl Landsteiner, 75, Austrian biologist and physician who was awarded the Nobel Prize in Physiology or Medicine in 1930 for his 1900 discovery of the distinction between major blood groups 
Fritz Schmidt, German Commissioner-General for the Netherlands, after jumping, falling or being pushed from a train.

June 27, 1943 (Sunday)
An empty American P-38 fighter, whose pilot had bailed out after the plane caught fire; crashed into a crowd of beachgoers at Huntington Beach, California, and then exploded injuring 49 people, three of them fatally.
Dresdner SC won the German football soccer championship game of Nazi Germany, defeating KSG FV/AK Saarbrücken, before a crowd of 80,000 people at the Olympiastadion in Berlin
Died: Edward O'Rourke, 66, Belarusian Roman Catholic priest, bishop of Riga from 1918 to 1920 and bishop of Danzig from 1922 to 1926

June 28, 1943 (Monday)
Germany began construction of four large rocket launch complexes, with 15 foot thick roofs and reinforced walls that were designed to withstand bombing, to launch missiles at the United Kingdom.  The missile bases were located in France along the English Channel, at Seninghem, Tamerville, Couville and Siracourt.
The Peenemünde Army Research Center successfully launched Germany's ballistic missile, the V2 rocket.  As Adolf Hitler watched, the initial launch ended with the rocket crash-landing nearby, but the second launch successfully traveled 142 miles to land in the Baltic Sea.
SS Major Karl Bischoff reported to Berlin that the four new crematoria that had been built at the Auschwitz concentration camp were completed.  Crematorium Number 1 could process 340 bodies per day, while the four new ones could handle 4,400.
The Italian cruiser Bari was bombed and sunk at Livorno by aircraft of the U.S. Eighth Air Force.
The Battle of Viru Harbor began between American and Japanese forces on New Georgia.
Born:  
Ismael Laguna, Panamanian boxer and world lightweight champion, 1965–1970; in Colón 
Ed Pastor, American Congressman and first Hispanic-American to represent Arizona in the U.S. House of Representatives (1991–2003); in Claypool, Arizona (died 2018)

June 29, 1943 (Tuesday)
In advance of the Allied invasion of Sicily, General Dwight D. Eisenhower, the Allied Supreme Commander, sent a cablegram from North Africa requesting "on early convoy ... shipment three million bottled Coca-Cola (filled) and complete equipment for bottling, washing, capping same quantity twice monthly", with the Coca-Cola Company sending "technical observers" to assist in the operation.
The U.S. Senate passed the first, and thus far, only national child-care program, voting $20,000,000 to provide for federal care of children whose mothers were employed for the duration of World War II. 
U.S. Vice-President Henry A. Wallace made "an ill-considered speech" that attacked U.S. Secretary of Commerce Jesse H. Jones.  The speech, which some historians cite as a factor in President Roosevelt's decision to select another running mate for the 1944 election, may have cost Wallace a chance to become President of the United States on Roosevelt's death in 1945.
Pope Pius XII issued the encyclical Mystici corporis Christi'' ("Of the Mystical Body of Christ").
Born:  
Little Eva (stage name for Eva Narcissus Boyd), American pop singer; in Belhaven, North Carolina (died 2003) 
Ahmed Sofa, Bangladeshi poet and novelist, in Chittagong, Bengal Province, British India (died 2001)

June 30, 1943 (Wednesday)
Operation Cartwheel began in the South Pacific Ocean, as Allied troops, under the direction of Admiral Bull Halsey, landed at the islands of New Georgia and Rendova.
Allied forces carried out the amphibious Landing at Nassau Bay.
The Battle of Wickham Anchorage began between U.S. and Japanese forces on Vangunu Island.
Born:  
Tenzin Palmo, English-born Tibetan Buddhist nun; as Diane Perry in Woolmers Park, Hertfordshire.  
Florence Ballard, one of the founding members of the popular female Motown vocal group The Supremes; in Detroit. (died 1976)

References

1943
1943-06
1943-06